Scott Michael McClain (born May 19, 1972) is a former Major League Baseball third baseman  who is a scout in Nippon Professional Baseball.

A versatile athlete, he played quarterback for Atascadero High School in Atascadero, California and signed a National Letter of Intent to play football for the University of Southern California before being drafted by the Baltimore Orioles.

McClain has spent most of his professional career bouncing around the minor leagues for numerous Major League Baseball organizations.

Over his professional career McClain has hit a total of 359 home runs: 287 in the minors, 71 in Japan and two in the MLB. He has also batted in 1,237 runs over his professional career (1,066 in the minors, 171 in Japan). He hit his first big league home run on September 3, 2008, playing for the Giants against the Colorado Rockies at Coors Field. He was the fourth River Cats player since  to win the award. McClain spent the 2007 and 2008 seasons with the Fresno Grizzlies, Triple-A affiliate of the Giants.

On January 20, 2010, McClain signed a minor league contract with the Chicago Cubs, but as of June 2010 he is not on the roster of any Cubs's minor league teams.

Later in 2010, Hiroshima added Scott McClain as a US-based scout.

References

External links

1972 births
Living people
Tampa Bay Devil Rays players
Chicago Cubs players
San Francisco Giants players
Major League Baseball first basemen
Major League Baseball third basemen
Seibu Lions players
Hiroshima Toyo Carp players
American expatriate baseball players in Japan
Baseball players from California
Rochester Red Wings players
Norfolk Tides players
Durham Bulls players
Colorado Springs Sky Sox players
Iowa Cubs players
Sacramento River Cats players
Fresno Grizzlies players
People from Simi Valley, California
Pacific Coast League MVP award winners
Sportspeople from Ventura County, California